Gary Vandermolen (born 2 May 1960) is an English retired Israeli footballer. During his career, Vandermolen played for Wimbledon and Southend United at youth level and for Beitar Jerusalem at senior level. Since retiring, he has become one of the highest ranked amateur golfers in Israel.

Honours
Liga Leumit
Winner 1986-87

References

1960 births
Living people
Jewish British sportspeople
English footballers
Israeli footballers
Beitar Jerusalem F.C. players
British emigrants to Israel
Liga Leumit players
Sportspeople from Southend-on-Sea
Association football forwards
Wimbledon F.C. players
Southend United F.C. players